During 1999, tropical cyclones formed within seven different bodies of water called basins. To date, 142 tropical cyclones formed in bodies of water known as tropical cyclone basins, of which 72 were given names by various weather agencies. Floyd was the costliest tropical cyclone of the year, with around $6.5 billion worth of damages as it affected the Bahamas, the East Coast of the United States, and the Atlantic Canada. The deadliest cyclone of this year was the 1999 Odisha cyclone, which was blamed for over 9,667 deaths as it devastated India. Three Category 5 tropical cyclones were formed in 1999.

Global atmospheric and hydrological conditions
A strong La Niña was present for the whole year, which made the Atlantic and North Pacific waters warmer than usual.

Summary

North Atlantic Ocean

An average Atlantic hurricane season features 12 tropical storms, 6 hurricanes, and 3 major hurricanes, and features an Accumulated Cyclone Energy (ACE) count of 106. The 1999 Atlantic hurricane season had five Category 4 hurricanes – the highest number recorded in a single season in the Atlantic basin, previously tied in 1961, and later tied in 2005 and 2020.

It was a fairly active season, mostly due to a persistent La Niña that developed in the latter half of 1998. The first storm, Arlene, formed on June 11 to the southeast of Bermuda. It meandered slowly for a week and caused no impact on land. Other tropical cyclones that did not affect land were Hurricane Cindy, Tropical Storm Emily, and Tropical Depression Twelve. Localized or otherwise minor damage occurred from Hurricanes Bret, Gert, and Jose, Tropical Storms Harvey and Katrina. The most significant storm of the season was Hurricane Floyd, a strong Category 4 hurricane that caused devastating flooding along the East Coast of the United States, especially in North Carolina. Damage from the storm totaled approximately $6.5 billion (1999 USD) and there were at least 77 fatalities, making it the deadliest hurricane in the United States since Hurricane Agnes in 1972. Flooding from Floyd in North Carolina followed Hurricane Dennis, a slow and erratic–moving storm that dropped heavy rainfall in the eastern portion of the state. Tropical Depression Eleven in October contributed to extreme flooding in Mexico, which left 636 people dead and caused $491.3 million in damage, though impact could not be distinguished from the storm itself. Hurricane Irene caused extensive flooding in Cuba and Florida, with lesser effects in the Bahamas and North Carolina. Irene was the second–costliest storm of the season, with about $800 million in damage. Hurricane Lenny was an unusual eastward–moving storm in the Caribbean Sea and a strong late–season storm. It caused extensive damage in the Lesser Antilles in the month of November.

Eastern and Central Pacific Ocean

An average Pacific hurricane season features 15 tropical storms, 9 hurricanes, and 4 major hurricanes, and features an Accumulated Cyclone Energy (ACE) count of 132. The season produced fourteen tropical cyclones and nine named storms, which was well below the average of sixteen named storms per season; this was largely due to a strong La Niña taking over much of the Pacific.

However, the total of six hurricanes and two major hurricanes during the season was near the averages of eight and three, respectively. Although it remained offshore, Hurricane Adrian caused 6 deaths from flooding and rough surf in Mexico. Hurricane Dora was a long-lived and intense cyclone, which had the second-longest track of a Pacific hurricane on record. The storm brought minor impacts to the island of Hawaii; however, no deaths or damage was reported. The deadliest tropical cyclone, Hurricane Greg, killed 10 people from flooding in Mexico.

Western Pacific Ocean 

The average typhoon season lasts year-round, with the majority of the storms forming between May and October. An average Pacific typhoon season features 26 tropical storms, 16 typhoons, and 9 super typhoons (unofficial category). It also features an average Accumulated Cyclone Energy (ACE) count of approximately 294; the basin is typically the most active basin for tropical cyclone formation. However, it was a very inactive season, featuring the lowest number of typhoons on record, five.

The 1999 Pacific typhoon season was the last Pacific typhoon season to use English names as storm names. In the season, there were 45 tropical depressions, in which 20 strengthened to tropical storms, of 5 further strengthening into a typhoon. Typhoon Bart was the only super typhoon of that year.

North Indian Ocean 

 
The season produced an average number of storms but there was an above average number of intense cyclones. In May, a Category 3 cyclone struck Pakistan, leaving at 700 people dead or missing. In October, two very intense cyclones struck eastern India within two weeks of each other, leaving over 10,000 people dead and causing more than $4.5 billion (1999 USD) in damages.

A total of ten tropical cyclones were observed. The India Meteorological Department, the official Regional Specialized Meteorological Center of the North Indian Ocean basin, identified eight of them. The Joint Typhoon Warning Center unofficially tracked two additional cyclones, 03B and 31W, during the course of the season.

South-West Indian Ocean

January–June 

Activity began late, with the first tropical storm – Alda – forming on January 16, the third latest ever recorded at the time. Alda formed in the Mozambique Channel, which was one of few favorable areas for tropical cyclogenesis in the season. It brought rainfall to southwestern Madagascar that alleviated previously dry conditions. The next five tropical storms either originated or crossed into the adjacent Australian basin, where storms were monitored by the Bureau of Meteorology (BoM). Both Tropical Storm Chikita and Tropical Cyclone Davina brought beneficial rainfall to the Mascarene Islands. The latter storm caused two drowning deaths on Réunion and caused some crop damage. The final storm was unnamed, crossing from the Australian basin on April 21 as a minimal tropical storm before quickly dissipating. There were also several tropical disturbances or depressions, many short-lived. The first of these formed on September 3 in the northeastern portion of the basin, and there was a tropical depression in February in the Mozambique Channel that approached tropical storm status.

July–December 
 
Despite the destructive nature of the season, it began later than usual. Cyclone Astride originated toward the end of December, bringing rainfall and gusty winds to northern Madagascar while in the region.

Australian Region

January–June 
 
The season featured Cyclone Gwenda, the most intense tropical cyclone in the Australian Region (later tied with Inigo in 2003) .  It was above average, with 14 tropical lows, with 9 further strengthening to a tropical cyclone, with 6 of those further becoming a severe tropical cyclone. The 1999 season started with Olinda forming on late January, exiting toward the South Pacific basin the next day. Damien, Rona, Elaine, Vance, Frederick, and Gwenda further strengthened to severe tropical cyclones. Hamish ended the season, exiting the basin to the South-West Indian Ocean on 21 April.

July–December 
 
3 tropical cyclones formed on late 1999, with 2 of them further becoming tropical cyclones: A tropical low, Ilsa, and John. Ilsa and John briefly affected Western Australia. A tropical low near Brisbane existed from 2 – 3 December.

South Pacific Ocean

January–June 
 
The 1998–99 South Pacific cyclone season was a near average South Pacific tropical cyclone season, with 8 tropical cyclones occurring within the South Pacific Ocean basin between 160°E and 120°W. Despite the season starting on November 1, the first tropical system of the season did not form until December 1, while the final disturbance of the season dissipated on May 27, 1999. After the season had ended the names Cora and Dani were retired from the naming lists, after they had caused significant impacts to South Pacific islands.

July–December 

5 tropical depressions formed throughout the year; however, they were all weak. A tropical depression existed from September and 4 more tropical depressions monitored by the FMS existed from November to early December.

Mediterranean Sea 

2 medicanes were observed in March 19–21, 1999 and September 13, 1999.

Systems

January

February

March

April

May

June

July

August

September

October

November

December

Global effects

See also

 Tropical cyclones by year
 List of earthquakes in 1999
 Tornadoes of 1999

Notes
2 Only systems that formed either on or after January 1, 1999 are counted in the seasonal totals.
3 Only systems that formed either before or on December 31, 1999 are counted in the seasonal totals.4 The wind speeds for this tropical cyclone/basin are based on the IMD Scale which uses 3-minute sustained winds.
5 The wind speeds for this tropical cyclone/basin are based on the Saffir Simpson Scale which uses 1-minute sustained winds.
6The wind speeds for this tropical cyclone are based on Météo-France which uses wind gusts.

References

External links

Regional Specialized Meteorological Centers
 US National Hurricane Center – North Atlantic, Eastern Pacific
 Central Pacific Hurricane Center – Central Pacific
 Japan Meteorological Agency – NW Pacific
 India Meteorological Department – Bay of Bengal and the Arabian Sea
 Météo-France – La Reunion – South Indian Ocean from 30°E to 90°E
 Fiji Meteorological Service – South Pacific west of 160°E, north of 25° S

Tropical Cyclone Warning Centers
 Meteorology, Climatology, and Geophysical Agency of Indonesia – South Indian Ocean from 90°E to 141°E, generally north of 10°S
 Australian Bureau of Meteorology (TCWC's Perth, Darwin & Brisbane) – South Indian Ocean & South Pacific Ocean from 90°E to 160°E, generally south of 10°S
 Papua New Guinea National Weather Service – South Pacific Ocean from 141°E to 160°E, generally north of 10°S
 Meteorological Service of New Zealand Limited – South Pacific west of 160°E, south of 25°S

Tropical cyclones by year
1999 Atlantic hurricane season
1999 Pacific hurricane season
1999 Pacific typhoon season
1999 North Indian Ocean cyclone season
1999–2000 Australian region cyclone season
1998–99 Australian region cyclone season
1999–2000 South Pacific cyclone season
1998–99 South Pacific cyclone season
1999–2000 South-West Indian Ocean cyclone season
1998–99 South-West Indian Ocean cyclone season
1999-related lists